Hyalaethea meeki is a moth of the subfamily Arctiinae. It was described by Rothschild in 1910. It is found in New Guinea.

References

 Natural History Museum Lepidoptera generic names catalog

Arctiinae
Moths described in 1910